Niuafoou, or Niuafoʻouan, is the language spoken on Tonga's northernmost island, Niuafoou.

Niuafoʻouan has traditionally been classified as closest to Uvean and Tokelauan, in an East Uvean–Niuafoʻou branch. However, recent research suggests that it is closest to its neighbour, Tongan, as one of the Tongic languages.

In September 2022 language campaigners called for it to be taught in primary schools on Niuafo’ou.

Phonology
The phonology of Niuafoʻou is similar to that of Tongan, with twelve consonants and five vowel phonemes.

Syllable structure
Niuafoʻou has a very simple syllable structure, (C)V. However, it is apparently transitioning towards allowing consonant clusters, due to the influence of foreign languages and the de-voicing of vowels.

References

Languages of Tonga
Tongic languages
Endangered Austronesian languages